Miss Teen USA 1998, the 16th Miss Teen USA pageant, was televised live from Shreveport, Louisiana on 17 August 1998.  At the conclusion of the final competition, Vanessa Minnillo of South Carolina was crowned by outgoing queen Shelly Moore of Tennessee.

The pageant was hosted by Mario Lopez with color commentary by Ali Landry and Julie Moran.  Landry held the Miss Louisiana Teen USA 1990, Miss Louisiana USA 1996 and Miss USA 1996 titles, making the semi-finals at Miss Teen USA 1990 pageant before winning Miss USA 1996.

During the pageant there was entertainment by N'Sync.

Vanessa Minnillo and Mario Lopez would later host together the 2007 Miss Universe pageant; Miss New York Linsay Fredette is the sister of BYU and NBA player Jimmer Fredette.

Results

Placements

Special awards
Miss Congeniality: Vanessa Minnillo (South Carolina)
Miss Photogenic: Nicole Broderick (Florida)
Style Award: Susie Castillo (Massachusetts)
Best in Swimsuit: Vanessa Minnillo (South Carolina)

Scores

 Winner
 First Runner-up
 Second Runner-up
 Top 5 Finalist
 Top 10 Semifinalist
(#) Rank in each round of competition

Historical significance
This was only Wyoming's second placement, after Emily Earnst placed first runner-up to Kelly Hu in 1985.  
Nevada placed for the first time since 1983, this was also only their second placement.  No other Nevada teen has bettered Victoria Franklin's placement, although Helen Salas equalled it when she placed second runner-up at Miss Teen USA 2004.  Franklin was Miss Nevada USA at the time, Salas' sister titleholder.
Mississippi placed for the first time since 1994.
Vanessa Minnillo became the first Miss Congeniality winner to also win the pageant. She also got the highest score ever in any semifinal: 9.96 in swimsuit.
Florida won the Miss Photogenic award for the third consecutive year, a first in the history of the pageant.  Nicole Broderick was Florida's first semi-finalist since 1995, and no other Florida teen would place until Jennifer Wooten made the top fifteen at Miss Teen USA 2006.

Delegates
The Miss Teen USA 1998 delegates were:

 Alabama - Heather Baugh
 Alaska - Sarah Ann Smith
 Arizona - Kristy Kay Stover
 Arkansas - Joan Lucas
 California - Amanda Joy O’Leary
 Colorado - Katee Doland
 Connecticut - Natalie Perez
 Delaware - Nicole Tomlin
 District of Columbia - Chartese DeQuinta Day
 Florida - Nicole Broderick
 Georgia - Midori Thompson
 Hawaii - Toby Anne Pohaikealoha Carter
 Idaho - Elizabeth Barchas
 Illinois - Nicole Manske
 Indiana - Tashina Kastigar
 Iowa - Arianna Kem
 Kansas - Ashley Tessendorf
 Kentucky - Elizabeth Arnold
 Louisiana - Jennifer Dupont    
 Maine - Krista Wakefield
 Maryland - Amber Coffman
 Massachusetts - Susie Castillo
 Michigan - Elizabeth Mathis
 Minnesota -  Kristi Renee Hilgenberg
 Mississippi - Jennifer Reel
 Missouri - Brittany McDonald
 Montana - Maggie Stoker
 Nebraska - Lori Anderson
 Nevada - Victoria Franklin
 New Hampshire - Nadiyah Humber
 New Jersey - Melissa Dungao
 New Mexico - Rana Jones
 New York -  Lindsay Fredette
 North Carolina - Lucy Parker
 North Dakota - Brandy Smolen
 Ohio - Stacy Offenberger
 Oklahoma - Tara Baker
 Oregon - Melissa Maki
 Pennsylvania - Katherine Kraus
 Rhode Island - Kristin Luneberg
 South Carolina - Vanessa Minnillo
 South Dakota - Summer Simunek
 Tennessee - Bridgett Jordan
 Texas - Christie Cole
 Utah - Trina Seymour
 Vermont - Dawn Amelia Carrow
 Virginia - Misty Horn
 Washington - Amber Lancaster
 West Virginia - Erica Bivans
 Wisconsin - Heidi Cody
 Wyoming - Gina DeBernardi

Contestant notes
Susie Castillo (Massachusetts) went on to win the Miss Massachusetts USA 2003 title, and then won the Miss USA 2003 pageant.  Castillo and Vanessa Minnillo (South Carolina) would later go on to become MTV VJ's in the 2000s.
Three of the six triple crown titleholders – women who held state titles for Miss Teen USA, Miss USA and Miss America – competed at Miss Teen USA 1998.
Only a year after passing on her Teen title, Jennifer Dupont (Louisiana) won the Miss Louisiana USA 2000 title, one of the few women to win teen and Miss titles in such close succession.  Dupont went on to win the Miss Louisiana 2004 title, and placed first runner-up to Deidre Downs at Miss America 2005.
Elizabeth Barchas (Idaho) won the Miss Idaho USA 2001 title, and competed with Doland at Miss USA 2001.  As Miss Idaho 2004 she competed at Miss America 2005 alongside Jennifer Dupont, and won a non-finalist interview award
Rana Jones (New Mexico) later won the Miss New Mexico 2003 title and competed in the Miss America pageant.  She later tried to win the Miss New Mexico USA title but was unsuccessful.  Her highest placement at Miss New Mexico USA was in the 2007 event, when she placed first runner-up to Casey Messer.
Other contestants who competed at Miss USA were:
Elizabeth Arnold (Kentucky) - Miss Kentucky USA 2002
Kristen Luneberg (Rhode Island) - Miss North Carolina USA 2003
Tashina Kastigar (Indiana) - Miss Indiana USA 2003 (semi-finalist at Miss USA 2003)
Victoria Franklin (Nevada) - Miss Nevada USA 2004
Stacy Offenberger (Ohio) - Miss Ohio USA 2006 (third runner-up at Miss USA 2006)
Amber Lancaster (Washington) is currently a model on The Price Is Right.
Elizabeth Mathis (Michigan) went on to a brief acting career, including a role as the lead character's grown daughter in the 2010 film Unstoppable.
Nicole Briscoe (née Manske) (Illinois) is currently an ESPN broadcaster after working in journalism in local Midwestern media, later including a part-time role with the Indianapolis Motor Speedway Radio Network before later working for Fox Sports.  Since her marriage to Australian INDYCAR driver Ryan Briscoe she has used her married name on-air and on social media.
Maggie Stoker (Montana) is the daughter of Mike Stoker, a former Los Angeles County Fire Department captain who starred in the 1970s TV series Emergency!.

Judges
Bill Bellamy
Tim Brando
Tara Lipinski
Austin O'Brien
Jonny Moseley
Sarah Schwab
Jill Stuart

External links
Official website

1998
1998 in the United States
1998 beauty pageants
1998 in Louisiana